John Nau may refer to:
 John L. Nau, American businessman
 John Antoine Nau, French poet and writer